(born 30 June 1973) is a Japanese IFBB professional bodybuilder. In 2007 he became the first Japanese bodybuilder to compete in the Mr. Olympia contest and was the first Japanese bodybuilder to have been invited to compete at the Arnold Classic.

Early life
Hidetada Yamagishi was born and raised in Obihiro, Hokkaido. During his youth, he played rugby and started lifting weights while at Hokkaido Sapporo Asahigaoka High School. He then proceeded to Waseda University, where he pursued weightlifting more seriously.

Career
Yamagishi has appeared in a number of magazines, including Weekly Playboy, Tarzan, and Ironman Japan, and has released a number of few training videos/DVDs, the latest being called 闘: A Warrior's Fight. He has also appeared on television in Japan.

In January 2008, Yamagishi was charged in California with possession (and supposed distribution) of steroids; he served a 65-day sentence in an American prison before being released and having all felony charges dismissed.

Yamagishi's "philosophy on training" is "an 'all or nothing' mentality. There is no such thing as 'impossible'. Train hard everyday, and even harder the next day!"

He lives both in the US and Japan. He holds a degree in Sports Nutrition Science and National Certification in Japan from the NSCA-Japan and National Certification in Japan for Acupuncture Therapy.

IFBB professional history

2005
 IFBB Ironman Pro Invitational - 17th

2006
 IFBB Grand Prix Austria - 12th
 IFBB Grand Prix Holland - 4th
 IFBB Grand Prix Romania - 6th
 IFBB Ironman Pro Invitational - Unplaced
 IFBB San Francisco Pro Invitational - 11th
 IFBB Santa Susanna Pro - 12th

2007
 IFBB Ironman Pro Invitational - 7th
 IFBB Arnold Classic - 13th
 IFBB Atlantic City Pro - 9th
 IFBB Mr. Olympia - 13th
 IFBB Grand Prix Australia - 5th
 IFBB Sacramento Pro Championships - 3rd

2008
 IFBB Atlantic City Pro - 9th

2009
 IFBB Ironman Pro Invitational - 4th
 IFBB New York Pro -5th
 IFBB Europa Show of Champions - 2nd
 IFBB Mr. Olympia - 9th

2010
 IFBB Mr. Olympia - 10th
 IFBB Arnold Classic - 8th
 IFBB New York Pro - 2nd
 IFBB Europa show of Champions - 1st
 IFBB Orlando Show of Champions - 10th
 IFBB Phoenix Pro - 2nd

2011
 IFBB Phoenix Pro - 2nd
 IFBB Pro Bodybuilding Weekly Championships (a.k.a. Tampa Pro) - 2nd
 IFBB Mr. Olympia - 10th

2012
 NPC Lansing Grand Prix - NP
 IFBB PBW Tampa Pro - 3rd
 IFBB Dallas Europa Supershow - 2nd
 IFBB Mr. Olympia - 15th
 IFBB Arnold Classic Europe - 12th
 IFBB British Grand Prix - 8th

2013
 IFBB Arnold Classic - 5th

2014
 IFBB Arnold Classic 212 category - 4th 
 IFBB Mr. Olympia 212 category - 4th
 IFBB Tampa Pro 212 category - 1st

2015
 IFBB Arnold Classic 212 category - 2nd
 IFBB Mr. Olympia 212 category - 3rd

2016 
 IFBB Arnold Classic 212 category - 1st
 IFBB Mr. Olympia 212 category - 6th
 IFBB Asia Grand Prix 212 category - 3rd

2017 
 IFBB Arnold Classic 212 category - 6th

2018 
 IFBB Arnold Classic - 10th
 IFBB Arnold Classic Australia - 5th
 IFBB Indy Pro - 7th

2019 
 IFBB Europa Dallas - 1st
 IFBB Mr. Olympia 212 category - 8th

2020 
 IFBB Mr. Olympia 212 category - 14th

References

External links
  
 Hidetada Yamagishi interview with evolutionofbodybuilding.net

Living people
1973 births
Japanese bodybuilders
Waseda University alumni
Competitors at the 2001 World Games